Men in Black 3 (stylized as MIB³) is a 2012 American science fiction action comedy film based on the Marvel Comics series of a similar name. It is the sequel to Men in Black (1997) and Men in Black II (2002) and third installment in the Men in Black franchise. Directed by Barry Sonnenfeld and written by Etan Cohen, the film stars Will Smith, Tommy Lee Jones, Josh Brolin, Jemaine Clement, Michael Stuhlbarg, and Emma Thompson. In the film, James Darrell Edwards III / Agent J (Smith) is required to go back in time to prevent the assassination of his partner Kevin Brown / Agent K (Jones), the fallout of which threatens the safety of Earth.

Development of the sequel began during filming of its predecessor, with its premise suggested by Smith to Sonnenfeld. Despite rumors of a fallout between Smith and Sonnenfeld during filming of Men in Black II, he, Smith and Jones were confirmed to return by May 2010, after being announced the previous year. David Koepp and Jeff Nathanson were later hired to perform uncredited rewrites to Cohen's original screenplay and principal photography began that November. Filming was split into two parts, first occurring between November and December 2010 and restarting between April and June 2011, taking place primarily in New York City. With an officially acknowledged production budget of $215 million, it is one of the most expensive films ever made.

Men in Black 3 first premiered at O2 World in Berlin on May 14, 2012, and was theatrically released in the United States by Sony Pictures Releasing on May 25. It received positive reviews from critics, with praise for the performances of the cast (particuarly Brolin's) and is considered an improvement over its predecessor. The film grossed $654.2 million worldwide, becoming the tenth-highest grossing film of 2012 and the highest grossing film in the franchise, unadjusted for inflation. A standalone sequel and spin-off, Men in Black: International, was released in 2019, without most of the original cast.

Plot

In 2012, alien criminal Boris the Animal, the last Boglodite, escapes from a maximum-security prison on the Moon to take revenge on Agent K, who shot off his left arm and captured him in 1969. He confronts K and his partner Agent J, telling the former he is "already dead". K attempts to prevent J from pursuing Boris and refuses to give any exact details about the events of his arrest. Back at MiB Headquarters, J discovers K was responsible not only for capturing Boris but for deploying the "ArcNet", an interplanetary shield that prevented the Boglodites from invading Earth, leading to their extinction. 

Boris travels back in time to July 16, 1969 to kill Agent K's younger self, altering history. With only J's memory somehow unaffected, no one else at the Agency understands his inquiries and knowledge regarding K until Agent O, the new Chief of MIB following Zed's death, eventually pieces together J's erratic actions as signs of a fracture in the space-time continuum. With K gone, the ArcNet was never deployed, and present-day Earth is defenseless from a Boglodite invasion.

Knowing from the Agency's records Boris will commit murder at Coney Island on July 15, 1969, J time travels to said date to kill Young Boris. However, he is arrested by young K, who takes him to MiB Headquarters and prepares to neuralyze him, but decides at the last minute to investigate his claims that he traveled from the future to stop Boris. They follow clues, leading them to a bowling alley, and then The Factory, where undercover MiB agent Andy Warhol directs them to Griffin, the last Archanan after the Boglodites destroyed his planet.

Griffin, who can see all possible future timelines and outcomes, senses Boris' coming attack on The Factory, but tells J and K where to meet him so he can give them the ArcNet before he flees. They meet Griffin at Shea Stadium, after which he is captured by Boris. J and K pursue and rescue Griffin, acquiring the ArcNet. Young Boris escapes and Old Boris arrives on the early morning of July 16 and they team up.

After K initially badly takes the news of what Old Boris will do to him, he, J, and Griffin use jetpacks to fly to Cape Canaveral to attach the ArcNet onto the Apollo 11 rocket to deploy it in space, but end up getting arrested by the military. Griffin shows a skeptical colonel the future, revealing to him the importance of their mission, and he assists them in getting to the launch site.

As the agents climb up the rocket's launch tower, they are attacked by both Borises. J uses his time-travel device to evade Old Boris' attacks and knocks him off the launch tower. K shoots off Young Boris' left arm, knocking him off of the tower while also restoring the timeline. K attaches the ArcNet to the rocket and it is deployed successfully when the rocket launches, with Old Boris incinerated by the rocket exhaust.

Young Boris attacks K on the beach leading to the launch site, but the colonel saves K by sacrificing himself. Boris tries to goad K into arresting him so history will repeat itself, but K kills him instead, breaking the cycle. The colonel's young son James arrives and when he inquires about his father, K neuralyzes him and tells him only that his father is a hero. Observing from afar, J realizes that he is James and that K has been watching over him his whole life, and that him witnessing the entire ordeal is the reason why the space-time fracture did not alter his memory.

With his mission complete, J returns to 2012, where he reconciles with K, who tells him the Boglodites have been extinct for forty years while J implies his new knowledge of the secret K has been hiding to protect him and thanks him. The un-aged Griffin observes this, and breaking the fourth wall, says it is his new favorite moment in human history.

Cast
 Will Smith as James Darrell Edwards III / Agent J: An MIB agent and longtime friend and partner of K. 
 Cayen Martin portrays J as a child in 1969.
 Tommy Lee Jones and Josh Brolin as Kevin Brown / Agent K: A veteran MIB agent and J's longtime partner. Jones portrays K in the present and Brolin portrays K in 1969.
 Jemaine Clement as Boris the Animal: A ruthless alien with a vendetta against K. Hates being called "the animal" and insists "it's just Boris."
 Emma Thompson and Alice Eve as Agent O: The head of MIB, succeeding Zed. Thompson portrays O in the present and Eve portrays O in 1969.
 Michael Stuhlbarg as Griffin: An alien with clairvoyant abilities.
 Mike Colter as James Darrell Edwards II: A military colonel and J's father.
 Nicole Scherzinger as Lilly Poison: Boris' girlfriend.
 Michael Chernus as Jeffrey Price: An electronics store clerk in possession of time travel technology.
 David Rasche as Agent X: The head of MIB in 1969.
 Keone Young as Mr. Wu: An alien who owns a Chinese restaurant.
 Bill Hader as Andy Warhol / Agent W: An artist who is secretly an MIB agent.
 Lenny Venito as Bowling Ball Head: An unnamed alien with a detachable head who works at a bowling alley.
 David Pittu as Roman the Fabulist: An alien posing as a fortune teller.
 Lanny Flaherty as Obadiah Price: The inventor of the time travel technology and Jeffrey's father.

Justin Bieber, Lady Gaga, Yao Ming, and Tim Burton make uncredited cameo appearances as aliens on the TV monitors. Will Arnett plays Agent J's new partner Agent AA in an uncredited role. Make-up artist Rick Baker has a cameo as the Brain Alien. Chloe Sonnenfeld, the daughter of director Barry Sonnenfeld, plays the flower child who encounters Boris at the carnival.

Production
The film's premise was first proposed to director Barry Sonnenfeld by Will Smith during the filming of Men in Black II in 2002, with Smith suggesting that his character, Agent J, travel back in time to save his partner, Agent K, while at the same time exploring Agent K's backstory. Sonnenfeld said the idea "turned out to be a very long process of development, mainly because of the knotting  issues of time travel." It was reported that Smith and executives were leery about bringing back Sonnenfeld because of conflicts on the set of Men in Black II. In a lawsuit filed against his former agents over commissions, Sonnenfeld alleged that Sony considered other directors for Men in Black 3. Sonnenfeld ultimately convinced all involved that he had a strong vision for the film.

The film was first announced on April 1, 2009, by Sony Pictures Entertainment president Rory Bruer during a Sony ShoWest presentation. By October 2009, Etan Cohen had been hired to write the screenplay. Sonnenfeld read the script and started working on it in January 2010. As of March 2010, Will Smith remained undecided whether to join the film or another, The City That Sailed. Sonnenfeld in May 2010 confirmed the return of Tommy Lee Jones and Smith. Both had expressed interest in 2008 in reprising their roles. The filmmakers also included Walter F. Parkes and Laurie MacDonald as producers, with Steven Spielberg as executive producer; all were producers of the two previous films.

In June 2010, writer David Koepp was hired to rewrite the Cohen script. A third writer, Jeff Nathanson, was hired in November 2010 to rewrite the segment of the script that takes place in 1969. Nathanson and Koepp, along with producer Spielberg, had previously worked together on the 2008 film Indiana Jones and the Kingdom of the Crystal Skull, which Spielberg directed.

Special effects artist Rick Baker created the practical aliens and prosthetic makeup for the film, reprising his role from the previous two Men in Black films. In designing the look for the alien creatures, Baker used the time travel plot device as a reason to design "retro" looking aliens reminiscent of science fiction B movies of the era, saying, "In 2012 the aliens should look like Men in Black aliens and in 1969 they should be retro aliens. Fishbowl space helmets, guys with space suits with ribbed things on it, exposed brains, [and] bug eyes."

Principal photography began on November 16, 2010, even though, "We knew starting the movie that we didn't have a finished second or third act," director Sonnenfeld said in 2012. "Was it responsible? The answer is, if this movie does as well as I think it will, it was genius. If it's a total failure, then it was a really stupid idea." Filming was originally slated to commence on October 18, 2010, and continue until May 2011, in New York City, with shooting starting in 2010 partly in order to take advantage of a New York tax break in which the state rebates 30 percent of production costs incurred there. Filming was ultimately split into two parts, the first taking place from November until about Christmas 2010; the filmmakers announced shooting would begin again in mid-February, but it was delayed until April. Sonnenfeld initially stated he would be shooting in 3D, but later decided to film in 2D and convert to 3D during post-production.

Set photos for the film appeared online on November 17, 2010, showing Smith, Jones, Emma Thompson, and Nicole Scherzinger. Filming was done in April 2011 in the Morris Park section of The Bronx. Parts of Coney Island, in Brooklyn, had parking and filming permits posted for April 24 and May 2–4, 2011, production dates for what the permits titled MIB3. Shooting also took place in Manhattan's SoHo neighborhood, and was scheduled to wrap in June.

For the film, the Ford Taurus SHO was selected as the MIB's official car, replacing the Ford LTD Crown Victoria and Mercedes-Benz E-Class from the first two films. For the 1969 scenes, a 1964 Ford Galaxie was used as the MIB's official car.

This is the first time Frank the Pug was absent in a Men in Black movie, as well as Chief Zed, Jack Jeebs, and actor David Cross. Instead Zed is written in the story as having died and been immortalized at MIB Headquarters, and a portrait of Frank can be seen in J's apartment. An advertisement for 'The Incredible Speaking Pug' can be seen as Agent J enters Coney Island during his time in 1969.

Release

Video game
Activision released MIB: Alien Crisis on May 22, 2012, for Xbox 360, PlayStation 3, and Nintendo Wii, featuring a never-before-seen MIB agent rather than Agent J or Agent K. Gameloft also developed a mobile phone video game based on the film, released on May 17, 2012, for iOS and Android.

Theatrical
Under distribution by Sony's  Columbia Pictures division, the film was theatrically released on May 25, 2012.

Home media
The film was released on DVD, Blu-ray, and Blu-ray 3D on November 30, 2012, and additionally as part of a Men in Black trilogy box set on Blu-ray. The trilogy was released on 4K UHD Blu-ray on December 5, 2017.

Music

The soundtrack for the film was composed by Danny Elfman and was released on May 29, 2012, four days after the film.

The song "Back in Time" by rapper Pitbull, which was not included on the film's soundtrack album but accompanies the end credits of the film, was released as a single on March 26, 2012. It is the first lead single released to accompany a Men in Black film not to be performed by Will Smith.

There were also many songs from the 1960s that feature, including "2000 Light Years from Home" by the Rolling Stones, "I'm Waiting for the Man" by the Velvet Underground, "Strange Brew" by Cream, and "Pictures of Matchstick Men" by Status Quo.

Reception

Box office
MIB 3 grossed $179 million in the US and Canada, and $475.2 million in other countries, for a worldwide total of $654.2 million. It had a worldwide opening weekend of $189.9 million, and had the biggest worldwide IMAX Memorial-Day weekend ($12.7 million from 474 theaters), surpassing the previous year's record of Pirates of the Caribbean: On Stranger Tides.

In North America, MIB 3 earned $1.55 million during its midnight run from 2,233 locations. On its opening day, the film debuted at the top of the box office, grossing $17.7 million (including midnight grosses). This was slightly lower than the opening days of its predecessors. During its three-day opening weekend, it topped the box office with $54.6 million, which was higher than the opening weekends of the two previous films. The movie then earned an additional $14.7 million on Memorial Day, bringing its four-day weekend total to $69.3 million. The opening weekend audience was 54 percent male and 56 percent over the age of 25. The film received a B+ at CinemaScore. It remained in first place at the North American box office for one week.

Outside North America, MIB 3 is the highest-grossing film of the Men in Black franchise and the tenth highest-grossing 2012 film. It made $135.3 million on its opening weekend from 85 territories. Its highest-grossing openings were recorded in China ($21.7 million), and Russia and the CIS ($16.9 million). It was in first place at the box office outside North America for two consecutive weekends.

Critical response
On Rotten Tomatoes, the film holds an approval rating of 68% based on 251 reviews, with an average rating of 6.1/10. The site's critical consensus reads, "It isn't exactly a persuasive argument for the continuation of the franchisebut Men in Black III is better than its predecessor and manages to exceed expectations." On Metacritic, the film has a weighted average score of 58 out of 100, based on 38 critics, indicating "mixed or average reviews". Audiences polled by CinemaScore gave the film an average grade of "B+" on an A+ to F scale, the same score earned by the first two films.

Roger Ebert gave the film 3 out of 4 stars, in particular praising Brolin's role as the young Agent K, which he cited as an excellent example of good casting. Ebert also praised the "ingenious plot, bizarre monsters, audacious cliff-hanging" and the "virtuoso final sequence." Richard Roeper gave the film 3.5 out of 5 stars while saying, "It's that rare threequel that doesn't suck. Great special effects, surprising amount of heart." A. O. Scott of The New York Times also gave it 3.5 out of 5 stars and commented, "Men in Black 3 arrives in the multiplexes of the world with no particular agenda. Which may be part of the reason that it turns out to be so much fun." Lisa Schwarzbaum of Entertainment Weekly noted, "Sonnenfeld and Cohen move their baby along with an integrity and gait that ought to serve as a blueprint for other filmmakers faced with the particular challenges of reviving big-ticket and time-dated hunks of pop culture." Rafer Guzman of Newsday wrote, "the franchise is no longer the zenith of blockbusterism, and the gooey effects from Hollywood veteran Rick Baker look overly familiar, but Men in Black 3 remains an amiable comedy with some fondly familiar faces."

Director Paul Thomas Anderson praised the film, saying, "It was [expletive] great. ... The time-travel stuff [made me] cry my eyes out. I'm a sucker for that stuff."

Rene Rodriguez of The Miami Herald gave the film 1 out of 4 stars and stated, "Men in Black 3 is so dull and empty, it's the first movie that has ever made me think 'Thank God this is in 3D.'"

Sequel

Before its production with different leads, both Will Smith and Tommy Lee Jones said that they would "consider" appearing in a fourth film.
 Jones said it would be "easy to pick up where we left off. We know what we are doing, we know how to do it. It's just a hell of a lot of fun." 
In July 2012, Columbia chief executive Doug Belgrad said:  By early 2013, Oren Uziel had begun writing a Men in Black 4 screenplay for Sony Pictures.

In September 2015, series producers Walter Parkes and Laurie MacDonald stated the series would be rebooted as a trilogy, most likely without the involvement of Will Smith.

In December 2014, it was revealed that Sony was planning a crossover between Men in Black and Jump Street. The news was leaked after Sony's system was hacked and then confirmed by the directors of the Jump Street films, Chris Miller and Phil Lord, during an interview. James Bobin was announced as director in 2016. On April 13, 2016, the movie was officially announced and revealed to be titled MIB 23. In 2016, Hill expressed doubts and said the project was unlikely to happen, and that it was too complicated to make it work.

A standalone sequel titled Men in Black: International was released in June 2019, starring Chris Hemsworth and Tessa Thompson, with Emma Thompson reprising her role.

See also
 Apollo 11 in popular culture

References

External links

 
 
 
 
 
 

2012 films
2012 3D films
2010s science fiction comedy films
2010s monster movies
Alien invasions in films
Amblin Entertainment films
American science fiction comedy films
American action comedy films
American buddy cop films
American sequel films
Columbia Pictures films
Cultural depictions of Andy Warhol
Films scored by Danny Elfman
Films about the Apollo program
American films about revenge
Films based on American comics
Films directed by Barry Sonnenfeld
Films set in 1969
Films set in 2012
Films set in Coney Island
Films set in Florida
Films set in New York City
Films shot in Los Angeles
Films shot in New York City
IMAX films
Men in Black (franchise)
Moon in film
Films about time travel
Secret histories
Films about extraterrestrial life
2010s buddy comedy films
Films with screenplays by Etan Cohen
2012 action comedy films
2012 science fiction action films
American buddy comedy films
Films produced by Walter F. Parkes
Cultural depictions of Neil Armstrong
Cultural depictions of Buzz Aldrin
Cultural depictions of Michael Collins (astronaut)
Apollo 11
2010s English-language films
2010s American films